Alankrita Sahai (born 14 April 1994) is an Indian super  model, actress and beauty pageant titleholder as Miss India Earth 2014.

She is the first Indian to win 7 titles at the Miss Earth pageant held in the Philippines. In 2018, she made her acting debut with the Netflix romantic comedy film called Love per Square Foot. The same year, she also played the role of Alisha in the film Namaste England. 

Her first project was wth Mr Himesh Reshamiyan in a music album launched by Amitabh Bachhan, Salman Khan and Tseries.
She featured in two great music videos kehta hai pal pal tumse and Coka they both were super hits. She recently shot for Tipppsy and dead girls don’t talk which are due for release. In such a short span of time she has done more than 300 campaigns and many tv commercials like: white tone, wild stone, BKT tyres with sunny Deol. Samsung, Axis’s bank, Pantene, Rmkv sarees, Loreal matrix, Fab India, Soch, Nissaan and many big brands have been associated with her name. She is also a tedx speaker and has won many awards.

She religiously works for habitat for humanity, joti foundation, sos children’s villages and many other organisations that work for the disabled and for the underprivileged. She’s been awarded by the Rotary and the WHO for her contributions. She has also featured in the Indias most desirable list for 5 consecutive years. She has been on the List Of Asias Most Beautiful Women as well.

Early life
Sahai was born in New Delhi, India. She did her schooling from the American Embassy School in Delhi and from Khaitan Public School Noida. For her higher studies she was enrolled in Gargi College, University of Delhi and University of Southern California.

At Miss Earth, Alankrita Sahai won 7 titles for the country and a Sponsored Crown Miss Pagudpud at Miss Earth. She did extremely well at the intentional pageant and was the last contestant from India sent by the Femina and Diva organisation.

Filmography

Film

Music videos

References

https://www.hindustantimes.com/entertainment/bollywood/alankrita-sahai-on-the-loss-of-her-father-i-wish-he-comes-back-to-my-life-as-my-kid-or-he-was-a-father-figure-to-all-my-friends-it-is-their-loss-as-well-101644557320750-amp.html

https://www.hindustantimes.com/entertainment/bollywood/i-plan-to-take-social-work-to-other-cities-as-well-alankrita-sahai-101637932725400-amp.html

https://www.freepressjournal.in/amp/entertainment/bollywood/alankrita-sahai-to-star-in-psychological-thriller-the-incomplete-man-with-warina-hussain-and-sharib-hashmi

https://www.hindustantimes.com/entertainment/bollywood/alankrita-sahai-on-oxygenshortage-it-is-infuriating-to-see-people-charging-exorbitant-price-for-oxygen-they-should-be-ashamed-101620121396953-amp.html

https://www.tribuneindia.com/news/chandigarh/all-for-the-love-of-city-equines-331349

https://www.glamsham.com/bollywood/news/alankrita-sahai-it-is-everyones-responsibility-to-help-not-just-frontline-workers

External links
 Miss Earth official website

Female models from Delhi
Indian beauty pageant winners
Femina Miss India winners
Living people
Miss Earth 2014 contestants
1994 births
People from New Delhi
Miss Earth India delegates
Gargi College alumni